Vladyslav Leonidov (born 11 February 1990 in Kharkiv, Ukrainian SSR) is a professional Ukrainian football goalkeeper.

Leonidov is product of youth team systems of FC Metalist. He spent three months on loan in the Ukrainian Second League's club FC Podillya Khmelnytskyi.

International career 
He was called up to Ukraine national under-21 football team for the Euro 2013 qualification game against  on 6 September 2011.

References

External links

1990 births
Living people
Footballers from Kharkiv
Ukrainian footballers
FC Podillya Khmelnytskyi players
FC Dnister Ovidiopol players
FC Metalurh Zaporizhzhia players
FC Kramatorsk players
NK Veres Rivne players
Ukrainian First League players
Ukrainian Second League players
Ukrainian Amateur Football Championship players
Association football goalkeepers